Sunpak is a Japanese manufacturer of photographic equipment.

List of products

 AP-52 Handle Mount Flash
 Auto14 flash
 Auto 16R Pro
 Auto20 flash
 Auto 32B flash
 Auto 383 Super
 Auto zoom 600 flash
 D macro
 DC7 Flash
 G Flash
 PF20XD
 PF30X
 PZ40X
 PZ42X
 PZ5000AF
 RD2000
 Remote Lite II

External links 
Sunpak Homepage

Photography companies of Japan
Companies based in Tokyo
Japanese brands
Sunpak flashes